Thiagarajan Kumararaja is an Indian film director and screenwriter. He made his feature film debut with the critically acclaimed neo-noir gangster film Aaranya Kaandam (2011), which earned him the Indira Gandhi Award for Best Debut Film of a Director at the 59th National Film Awards.

Career
Thiagarajan Kumararaja was born and raised in Chennai, Tamil Nadu, India. His parents thought he would pick up bad habits if he stepped out, so he stayed mostly at home. He likes books of Sujatha, Rajesh Kumar, Kovi Manisekaran & Sandilyan. But the real entertainment was the bus ride from his home in Porur to Santhome Higher Secondary School. He used to stand next to the driver, observing the driver. "I wanted to be a PTC bus driver," he says. At the Class XII failed in Mathematics subject. On his words "If I didn’t like the teacher, I wouldn’t study."

He enrolled for a Visual Communications course at the Loyola College, Chennai, but dropped out shortly after to make films. Kumararaja cited that it was composer Ilaiyaraaja's music that animated him to come to films and to study Visual Communications in the first place. However, he discontinued his studies in 1998 and started to work as a freelance copywriter and photographer for a while. He went on to shoot advertisement films and also directed a five-part documentary on South Indian Temples, Sthala Puranam for Vijay TV. In 2005, he participated at the one-minute film competition 60 Seconds to Fame by Ability Foundation, aiming for the prize money. His short film Becky was awarded the first prize at the Ability Fest 2005. Kumararaja then collaborated with Pushkar-Gayathri, writing the dialogue of their directorial debut Oram Po (2007). He also wrote song lyrics for their second project Va (2010) as well. Through Pushkar-Gayathri, Kumararaja met S. P. B. Charan, who agreed to produce his first feature film Aaranya Kaandam.

Kumararaja began writing his maiden film in December 2006. Although he had wanted to make a "racy film" – he wrote the climax part first, before going on to add multiple storylines – he said that the film had eventually turned out to be a "leisurely paced film, taking its own time to unfold". Kumararaja met Charan in January 2007 and narrated him the script for two hours. Filming was supposed to commence by late 2007, but Charan opted to produce another film first. Aaranya Kaandam was launched in December 2008, starring Ravi Krishna and Sampath Raj, with Bollywood actor Jackie Shroff, who was being introducing to Tamil films. Kumararaja took more than one and a half years to complete the film, which was entirely shot in and around Chennai. Upon completion, the film ran into trouble when the regional censor board in Chennai refused to clear it, demanding 52 cuts due to profanity and excessive violence. Kumararaja expressed that he made the film for a matured audience and not for children, while adding that he expected difficulties in the censorship. Since he wanted to present the film uncompromisingly to the audiences, he and Charan approached the Central Tribunal at Delhi, that cleared the film. Dubbed as the first neo-noir film in Tamil cinema, Aaranya Kaandam opened to strong critical acclaim, winning the Grand Jury Award for Best Film at the 2010 South Asian International Film Festival, and two prizes at the 59th National Film Awards, including the Indira Gandhi Award for Best Debut Film of a Director for Kumararaja.

In 2015, he was involved as a script consultant for the Tamil film Yennai Arindhaal, which was co-written and directed by Gautham Vasudev Menon.

Filmography

As Other

Awards

References

External links
 

Living people
Screenwriters from Tamil Nadu
Tamil film directors
1976 births
Film directors from Chennai
Tamil screenwriters
21st-century Indian film directors
Director whose film won the Best Debut Feature Film National Film Award